Nikhat Khan Hegde is an Indian actress, model and film producer.

Background and personal life
Nikhat was born in Mumbai on 4 August 1962 into an Indian Muslim family, the daughter of Bollywood actor, director, producer, and writer Tahir Hussain and his wife, Zeenat Hussain. She is the eldest of four children. She has a sister named Farhat Khan Datta and two brothers, Aamir Khan and Faisal Khan both actors. The actor Imran Khan is the son of Nikhat's first cousin Nuzhal Khan. Nikhat's only sister, Farhat, is married to Rajeev Datta, brother of Reena Dutta who is the first wife of Aamir Khan. 

Apart from her father and brothers, several other of Nikhat's relatives have been active in the Hindi film industry, including her late uncle, the producer-director Nasir Hussain and his son, Mansoor Khan (director of Qayamat Se Qayamat Tak. The family has significant connections beyond the film industry. Maulana Abul Kalam Azad, the Muslim scholar who was a close associate of Mahatma Gandhi, and who was made India's first Minister of Education by Jawaharlal Nehru, was Nikhat's great-grand-uncle. The politician Najma Heptulla is a cousin of Nikhat's father.

Nikhat is married to Santosh Hegde (not to be confused with N. Santosh Hegde). Santosh is a Kannadiga and from a Tulu-speaking family in Karnataka. He retired as the CEO of a Pune-based pharmaceuticals company. Santosh, who is ten years older than Nikhat, was a divorcee with a 10-year-old son, Shravan Hegde. They both met Nikhat, while on holiday, at the Ranthambore tiger reserve in Rajasthan. The couple got married after a brief period of courtship and are the parents of a daughter, Seher Hegde. Nikhat enjoys a good relationship with her step-son, Shravan, who was raised by his own mother. 

Nikhat and her family lived in Pune for 14 years, before moving to Mumbai after Hegde's retirement, in order to take care of Nikhat's aged mother, and to enable Nikhat to pursue her acting career, which took off in a big way, rather unexpectedly, after she reached a certain age. She now features in both films and advertisements as an elegant middle-aged lady.

Career

As actor 
 Mission Mangal (2019) Role: Doctor
 Saand Ki Aankh (2019) Role: Maharani of Alwar
 Tanhaji (2020) Role: Uday Bhans mother
 Chacha Chackan Ke Karname (2019) Play in Hindi
 Special Ops 1.5: The Himmat Story  Web Series 
 Guilty Minds   Web Series
 Fauda   Web Series
 Jamai Raja 2.0 Web Series
 Thoda Sa Baadal Thoda Sa Paani
 Hush Hush   Web Series
 Banni Chow Home Delivery
 Pathaan (2023) Role: Pathan's foster mother

As model in advertisements 
  Axis Bank Senior Citizen Festival
  Don & Julio Suiting
  Brigade Group 'Zindagi Milegi Dobara'
  Fazlani Foods 'Cut the packet not the connection'
  Reliance Jewels
  ORANGE Health labs Print/Hoarding and video
   Vivo Khushi Inspires and enables
  Amazon
  Wonder Cement
  Welspun logistics
  Haldirams
  Orange health Labs
  First cry
  Wipro lights
  Paytm
  Head & Shoulders
  Bournvita master blaster
  Fazlani cut the packet
  Indiabulls
  Wellspun Bedsheets

As producer 
Nikhat is nominally one of the producers for these films made by her father and other members of her family.
 Dulha Bikta Hai (1982) - the 20-year-old Nikhat was named as producer by her father for tax purposes
 Tum Mere Ho (1990)
 Hum Hain Rahi Pyar Ke (1993)
 Madhosh (1994)
 Lagaan (2001)
 Produced a pair of Hindi Plays directed by Makarand Deshpande (genuine production efforts)

References

External links

MOTHERS DAY  with Ammi Aamir and Santosh
https://www.msn.com/en-in/entertainment/other/mother-s-day-aamir-khan-celebrates-special-day-with-mother-sister-brother-in-law/ar-AAX2F0z

Indian women film producers
Living people
Indian Muslims
Hindi film producers
1962 births